ADAP or Adap may refer to:

Adap language, in Bhutan
AdapTV
ADAP1 (gene)
ADAP2 (gene)
Associação Desportiva Atlética do Paraná
Adhesion and Degranulation promoting Adapter Protein, also known as FYB or SLAP-130
Agricultural Development in the American Pacific
AIDS Drug Assistance Programs